Throughout most of its history, Istanbul has ranked among the largest cities in the world. By 500 CE, Constantinople had somewhere between 400,000 and 500,000 people, edging out its predecessor, Rome, for world's largest city. Constantinople jostled with other major historical cities, such as Baghdad, Chang'an, Kaifeng and Merv for the position of world's most populous city until the 12th century. It never returned to being the world's largest, but remained Europe's largest city from 1500 to 1750, when it was surpassed by London.

The Turkish Statistical Institute estimates that the population of Istanbul Metropolitan Municipality was 14,377,019 at the end of 2014, hosting  of the country's population.  Then about 97–98% of the inhabitants of the metropolitan municipality were within city limits, up from 89% in 2007 and 61% in 1980. 64.9% of the residents live on the European side and 35.1% on the Asian side. While the city ranks as the world's 5th-largest city proper, it drops to the 24th place as an urban area and to the 18th place as a metro area because the city limits are roughly equivalent to the agglomeration. Today, it forms one of the largest urban agglomerations in Europe, alongside Moscow. The city's annual population growth of  ranks as the highest among the seventy-eight largest metropolises in the Organisation for Economic Co-operation and Development. The high population growth mirrors an urbanization trend across the country, as the second and third fastest-growing OECD metropolises are the Turkish cities of İzmir and Ankara.

Istanbul experienced especially rapid growth during the second half of the 20th century, with its population increasing tenfold between 1950 and 2000. This growth in population comes, in part, from an expansion of city limits—particularly between 1980 and 1985, when the number of Istanbulites nearly doubled. The remarkable growth was, and still is, largely fueled by migrants from eastern Turkey seeking employment and improved living conditions. The number of residents of Istanbul originating from seven northern and eastern provinces is greater than the populations of their entire respective provinces; Sivas and Kastamonu each account for more than half a million residents of Istanbul. Istanbul's foreign population, by comparison, is very small, 42,228 residents in 2007. Only  of the city's residents are originally from Istanbul. The most densely populated areas tend to lie to the northwest, west, and southwest of the city center, on the European side; the most densely populated district on the Asian side is Üsküdar.

Religious groups

Istanbul has been a cosmopolitan city throughout much of its history, but it has become more homogenized since the end of the Ottoman Empire. The vast majority of people across Turkey, and in Istanbul, are Muslim, and more specifically members of the Sunni branch of Islam. Most Sunni Turks follow the Hanafi school of Islamic thought, while Sunni Kurds tend to follow the Shafi'i school. The largest non-Sunni Muslim group, accounting 10-20% of Turkey's population, are the Alevis; a third of all Alevis in the country live in Istanbul. Mystic movements, like Sufism, were officially banned after the establishment of the Turkish Republic, but they still boast numerous followers. Istanbul is a migrant city. Since the 1950s, Istanbul's population has increased from 1 million to about 10 million residents. Almost 200,000 new immigrants, many of them from Turkey's own villages, continue to arrive each year. As a result, the city constant change, constantly reshaped to achieve the needs of these new population.

The Patriarch of Constantinople has been designated Ecumenical Patriarch since the sixth century, and has come to be regarded as the leader of the world's  Orthodox Christians. Since 1601, the Patriarchate has been based in Istanbul's Church of St. George. Into the 19th century, the Christians of Istanbul tended to be either Greek Orthodox, members of the Armenian Apostolic Church or Catholic Levantines.

Eldem Edhem, in his entry on "Istanbul" in the Encyclopedia of the Ottoman Empire, wrote that about 50% of the residents of the city were Muslim at the turn of the 20th century.

Ethnic groups

In the late Ottoman period non-Muslim ethnic minorities in the empire used French as a lingua franca and therefore used French-language newspapers and other media. In addition French businesspeople and vocational workers used French-language media to get in touch with clients in the empire. French-language journalism was initially centred in Smyrna (now Izmir) but by the 1860s it began shifting towards Constantinople. Many newspapers in non-Muslim minority and foreign languages were produced in Galata, with production in daylight hours and distribution at nighttime; Ottoman authorities did not allow production of the Galata-based newspapers at night.

Arabs

The Arabic newspaper Al Jawaib began in Ottoman Constantinople, established by Ahmad Faris al-Shidyaq a.k.a. Ahmed Faris Efendi (1804–1887),  after 1860. It published Ottoman laws in Arabic, including the Ottoman Constitution of 1876.

Armenians

 there are between 50,000 and  Armenians in Istanbul, down from about 164,000 according to the Ottoman Census of 1913.

Bulgarians
Bulgarian newspapers in the late Ottoman period published in Constantinople were Makedoniya, Napredŭk or Napredǎk ("Progress"), Pravo, and Turtsiya; Johann Strauss, author of "A Constitution for a Multilingual Empire," described the last one as "probably a Bulgarian version of [the French-language paper] La Turquie."

Greeks

Constantinople had a majority Greek population from the 8th century BCE through till the Ottoman conquest in 1453.

After 1453, there remained a group of prominent ethnic Greeks and/or people adopting Greek culture, the Phanariotes, based in the neighbourhood of Phanar, now Fener, in Fatih. About eleven families were a part of the Phanariotes.

The city remained a centre of Greek cultural and political life, and Greeks were very present in the city. According to the Ottoman census of 1893, Greeks made up almost 30% of the city's population, while accounting for 43% of the population in the suburbs. As the city was also home to significant Armenian, Catholic and Jewish minorities, there were more non-Muslims than Muslims in Istanbul, with Muslims making up 44% of the city's population in 1893. The Greek community also dominated the city's economy, owning 50% of the city's total production and distribution capital in 1915. In 1919, of the city's 1,173,670 inhabitants, 364,459 were Greeks (31%) and 449,114 were Turks (38%).

Because of events during the 20th century—including the Greek genocide, the 1923 population exchange between Greece and Turkey, a 1942 wealth tax, and the 1955 Istanbul riots—the Greek population, originally centered in Fener and Samatya, has decreased substantially. 

At the start of the 21st century, Istanbul's Greek population numbered 3,000 (down from 260,000 out of 850,000 according to the Ottoman Census of 1910, and a peak of 350,000 in 1919).

There is a Greek newspaper, Apoyevmatini.

Jews

The neighbourhood of Balat used to be home to a sizable Sephardi Jewish community, first formed after their expulsion from Spain in 1492. Romaniotes and Ashkenazi Jews resided in Istanbul even before the Sephardim, but their proportion has since dwindled; today,  of Istanbul's Jews are Ashkenazi. In large part due to emigration to Israel, the Jewish population nationwide dropped from 100,000 in 1950 to 18,000 in 2005, with the majority of them living in either Istanbul or İzmir.

Kurds

The largest ethnic minority in Istanbul is the Kurdish community, originating from eastern and southeastern Turkey. Although the Kurdish presence in the city dates back to the early Ottoman period, the influx of Kurds into the city has accelerated since the beginning of the Kurdish–Turkish conflict with the PKK (i.e. since the late 1970s). About two to four million residents of Istanbul are Kurdish, meaning there are more Kurds in Istanbul than in any other city in the world.

Levantines
The Levantines, Latin Christians who settled in Galata during the Ottoman period, played a seminal role in shaping the culture and architecture of then-Constantinople during the 19th and early 20th centuries; their population in Istanbul has dwindled, but they remain in the city in small numbers.

Turks
Parallel to the overall demographics of Turkey, Turks are the largest group in Istanbul. Although the presence of Turks in Istanbul goes back to the early Ottoman times, the bulk of this population is composed of recent migrants from the Balkans and Anatolia.

Other ethnicities

There are other significant ethnic minorities as well, the Bosniaks are the main people of an entire district—Bayrampaşa.

From the increase in mutual cooperation between Turkey and several African States like Somalia and Djibouti, several young students and workers have been migrating to Istanbul in search of better education and employment opportunities.  the major areas of African settlement are Eminönü and Yenikapi in Fatih, and Kurtulus and Osmanbey in Şişli. The largest groups of Africans that year were from Nigeria and Somalia, with the latter often working in business and the manufacturing of clothing. There are also Cameroonian, Congolese, and Senegalese communities present, with the first group directly involved in the vending of clothing and the last involved in the sale of goods streetside.

As of 2011 about 900 Japanese persons resided in Istanbul; 768 were officially registered with the Japanese Consulate of Istanbul as of October 2010. Of those living in Istanbul, about 450–500 are employees of Japanese companies and their family members, making up around half of the total Japanese population. Others include students of Turkish language and culture, business owners, and Japanese women married to Turkish men. Istanbul has several Japanese restaurants, a Japanese newspaper, and a 32-page Japanese magazine. According to the Istanbul Japanese School, circa 2019 there were about 2,000 Japanese citizens in the Istanbul area, with about 100 of them being children of the ages in which, in Japan, they would be legally required to attend school. At the same period there were about 110 Japanese companies in operation in the city. Istanbul also has a weekend Japanese education programme, The Japanese Saturday School in Istanbul.

After the Romanian revolution, a significant number of Romanian entrepreneurs started investing and establishing business ventures in Turkey, and a certain proportion chose to take up residence there in Istanbul. There are also Romanian migrant workers, as well as students and artists living in the city. Some sources claim that there are 14.000 Romanians living in Istanbul. There is also a Romanian Orthodox Church in the city.

Russians began migrating to Turkey during the first half of the 1990s. Most had fled the economic problems prevalent after the dissolution of the Soviet Union. During this period, many intermarried and assimilated with locals, bringing a rapid increase in mixed marriages. Following the 2022 Russian invasion of Ukraine, many Russians have fled to Turkey, especially Istanbul, after Vladimir Putin announced a "partial mobilization" of military reservists.

See also
 Demographics of Turkey

Notes

Bibliography
 
 
 
 
 
  - Also credited: Robert Ilbert (collaboration). Old .
 
 
 
 
 (info page on book at Martin Luther University)

References

External links
 
Istanbul
Istanbul
Istanbul